Karl Meiler defeated Guillermo Vilas 6–7, 2–6, 6–4, 6–4, 6–4 to win the 1972 ATP Buenos Aires singles competition. Željko Franulović was the champion but did not defend his title.

Draw

Final

Section 1

Section 2

External links
 1972 ATP Buenos Aires Singlesd draw

Singles